Zeioddin Expressway (Highway) Starts from western Tehran at Yasini Expressway and goes west. It ends in Pasdaran Street. The section between Hengam Boulevard and Parvin Boulevard was opened on 15 October 2011 the last 5 km from Parvin Boulevard to Yasini Expressway on 29 September 2012.

References

Expressways in Tehran